"Tere Mast Mast Do Nain" is an Indian Hindi song from the Bollywood film Dabangg starring Salman Khan and Sonakshi Sinha, directed by Abhinav Kashyap. The song was released as a part of the film's soundtrack album on 20 August 2010. The music was composed by Sajid–Wajid and sung by Rahat Fateh Ali Khan and Shreya Ghoshal. Choreography is by Mahesh Limaye. The song is set in a busy market place. Chulbul Pandey (Salman Khan) was trying to impress Rajo (Sonakshi Sinha). When Chulbul Pandey finds that he was in love with Rajo, the Tere Mast Mast Do Nain song starts at this point.

Awards and nominations
Winner BIG Star Entertainment Awards Best Singer (2010) – Rahat Fateh Ali Khan
Winner Mirchi Music Award for Male Vocalist of The Year (2010) – Rahat Fateh Ali Khan
Winner Mirchi Music Award for Music Composer of The Year (2010) – Sajid–Wajid
Nominated Mirchi Music Award for Song of The Year (2010)
Nominated Mirchi Music Award for Lyricist of The Year (2010) – Faiz Anwar
Winner 2011 IIFA Awards Best Male Vocalist (2011)
Winner Apsara Award for Best Playback Singer (2011)

Sequel
In the movie Dabangg 2 (2012), this song has a sequel entitled "Dagabaaz Re".

In the movie Jai Ho (2014), another similar song entitled "Tere Naina Maar Hi Daalenge" also composed by Sajid–Wajid and sung by Shaan and Shreya Ghoshal was picturised on Salman Khan and Daisy Shah.

References

External links
 

Hindi film songs
2010 songs
Shreya Ghoshal songs
Rahat Fateh Ali Khan songs
Qawwali songs